Song Long (Chinese: 宋龙; pinyin: Sòng Lóng; born 20 August 1989 in Qingdao, Shandong) is a Chinese footballer who currently plays as a left-back or midfielder for Shandong Taishan in the Chinese Super League.

Club career
Song joined Qingdao Jonoon from Dalian Shide in 2010. On 17 April 2010, he made his senior debut in a 2010 Chinese Super League match which Qingdao Jonoon tied with Liaoning Whowin 3–3. After the game he would go on to establish himself as regular within the team, however by the 2013 Chinese Super League season he would be part of the squad that was relegated at the end of the campaign. He remained with the club and he scored his first senior goal on 19 July 2014 in a 3–0 victory against Hebei Zhongji.

On 14 July 2016, Song transferred to Chinese Super League side Shandong Luneng. He made his debut for Shandong in a 4–1 away victory against Hangzhou Greentown. He would go on to establish himself as a regular within the team and was part of the squad that won the 2020 Chinese FA Cup against Jiangsu Suning F.C. in a 2-0 victory. A consistent versatile regular within the team, he would gain his first league title with the club when he was part of the team that won the 2021 Chinese Super League title. This would be followed up by him winning the 2022 Chinese FA Cup with them the next season.

Career statistics 
Statistics accurate as of match played 31 January 2023.

Honours

Club
Shandong Luneng/ Shandong Taishan
Chinese Super League: 2021
Chinese FA Cup: 2020, 2021, 2022.

References

External links
Song Long at football-lineups.com
 

1989 births
Living people
Association football midfielders
Chinese footballers
Footballers from Qingdao
Qingdao Hainiu F.C. (1990) players
Shandong Taishan F.C. players
Chinese Super League players
China League One players